Slanting Peak is a  glaciated mountain summit located in the Boundary Ranges of the Coast Mountains, in the U.S. state of Alaska. Slanting Peak is surrounded by the North Branch Norris Glacier to its west, and Taku Glacier on the east, and set on land managed by Tongass National Forest. This peak's descriptive name was published in 1960 by the U.S. Geological Survey.

Climate
Based on the Köppen climate classification, Slanting Peak is located in a subarctic climate zone, with long, cold, snowy winters, and cool summers. Weather systems coming off the Gulf of Alaska are forced upwards by the Coast Mountains (orographic lift), causing heavy precipitation in the form of rainfall and snowfall. Temperatures can drop below −20 °C with wind chill factors below −30 °C. The month of July offers the most favorable weather to view or climb Slanting Peak.

See also

Geospatial summary of the High Peaks/Summits of the Juneau Icefield
Geography of Alaska

References

External links
 Slanting Peak weather forecast
              

Mountains of Alaska
Mountains of Juneau, Alaska
Boundary Ranges